Ankrum is a surname. Notable people with the surname include:

Aubrey Ankrum (born 1972), American screenwriter, animator, and graphic artist
Morris Ankrum (1896–1964), American actor
Tyler Ankrum (born 2001), American stock car racing driver